Fourth class is a passenger seating class in transportation, one of the lowest classes with least frills or features

4th class or variation, may also refer to:

Transportation
 Fourth-class mail, in postal delivery
 Cape Government Railways 4th Class locomotives

Honours
 Fourth-class honours, in British education
 Order of St. George, 4th Class of Russia
 Order of the Red Eagle, 4th Class Knight of Prussia
 4th class Military Merit Order (Bavaria)

Rank or grade in military or paramilitary
 Specialist fourth class, a military rank
 Technician Fourth Class, a military rank

Other uses
 4th class city in Missouri; see List of cities in Missouri

See also

 Class 4 (disambiguation)
 Delta class (disambiguation)
 Fourth (disambiguation)
 Four (disambiguation)
 Class (disambiguation)